Lacona is a city in Warren County, Iowa, United States. The population was 345 at the time of the 2020 census. It is part of the Des Moines metropolitan area.

History
Lacona was laid out in 1856. It was incorporated in 1881.

Geography

Demographics

2010 census
As of the census of 2010, there were 361 people, 152 households, and 102 families residing in the city. The racial makeup of the city was 99.7% White and 0.3% from two or more races. Hispanic or Latino of any race were 0.6% of the population.

There were 152 households, of which 32.9% had children under the age of 18 living with them, 55.3% were married couples living together, 10.5% had a female householder with no husband present, 1.3% had a male householder with no wife present, and 32.9% were non-families. 28.9% of all households were made up of individuals, and 11.1% had someone living alone who was 65 years of age or older. The average household size was 2.38 and the average family size was 2.96.

The median age in the city was 37.6 years. 27.1% of residents were under the age of 18; 5% were between the ages of 18 and 24; 26% were from 25 to 44; 25.2% were from 45 to 64; and 16.6% were 65 years of age or older. The gender makeup of the city was 49.0% male and 51.0% female.

2000 census
As of the census of 2000, there were 360 people, 151 households, and 97 families residing in the city. The racial makeup of the city was 98.61% White, 0.28% Asian, and 1.11% from two or more races.

There were 151 households, out of which 31.1% had children under the age of 18 living with them, 55.6% were married couples living together, 5.3% had a female householder with no husband present, and 35.1% were non-families. 31.8% of all households were made up of individuals, and 19.9% had someone living alone who was 65 years of age or older. The average household size was 2.38 and the average family size was 3.08.

In the city, the population was spread out, with 24.2% under the age of 18, 9.4% from 18 to 24, 30.0% from 25 to 44, 20.6% from 45 to 64, and 15.8% who were 65 years of age or older. The median age was 38 years. For every 100 females, there were 97.8 males. For every 100 females age 18 and over, there were 93.6 males.

The median income for a household in the city was $39,375, and the median income for a family was $47,083. Males had a median income of $35,625 versus $25,750 for females. The per capita income for the city was $17,897. About 7.9% of families and 7.0% of the population were below the poverty line, including 5.9% of those under age 18 and 10.5% of those age 65 or over.

Education
Southeast Warren Community School District, which serves the municipality, was formed in 1959 as a consolidation of area schools. It operates SE Warren Elementary in Milo, SE Warren Intermediate in Lacona, and SE Warren Junior-Senior High in Liberty Center.

Notable people 

Dave Baker, pro baseball player 
Cliff Clevenger, United States Representative from Ohio 1939-1959

References

Cities in Iowa
Cities in Warren County, Iowa
Des Moines metropolitan area
1856 establishments in Iowa